Northlake may refer to:

 Northlake, Georgia, an unincorporated community in DeKalb County
 Northlake, Illinois, a city in Cook County
 Northlake, South Carolina, a census-designated place (CDP) in Anderson County
 Northlake, Texas, a town in Denton County
 Northlake, Seattle, a neighborhood

See also
North Lake (disambiguation)